Hugh Anderson Haralson (November 13, 1805 – September 25, 1854) was an American farmer, lawyer and politician based in Lagrange, Georgia.

Early years and education
Hugh Haralson was born November 13, 1805, in Greene County, Georgia. He graduated from Franklin College of Arts and Sciences (University of Georgia). After graduation, Haralson was admitted to the bar by way of a special act of the Legislature, because he was under the age of twenty-one.

Political and military careers
Haralson first served in the Georgia House of Representatives, at age 26, from 1831 to 1832. He was next elected to the Georgia State Senate in 1836, and served from 1837 to 1838.  He was commissioned as a major general in the Georgia Militia, 9th Division, in 1838. Haralson was originally a member of the Whig Party, but left when that party advocated for a restoration of the Bank of the United States, something that Haralson was opposed to because of his Jeffersonian leanings. Haralson subsequently joined the Democratic Party and stood for election to Congress under that banner. Despite the fact that Georgia voted overwhelmingly for the Whig party, in 1840, Haralson was elected as a Democrat two years later. Haralson represented Georgia in the U.S. Congress from 1843 to 1851, where he was chairman of the Committee on Military Affairs during the Mexican–American War. He was the father-in-law of the famous Confederate General, and Georgia governor John B. Gordon.

Death and legacy
Hugh A. Haralson died September 25, 1854, in LaGrange, Georgia. Haralson County, Georgia and the city of Haralson, Georgia in Coweta County, are named in his honor.

References

External links
 Hugh Anderson Haralson Letterbook – Atlanta History Center
 
 Smith, Gordon Burns, History of the Georgia Militia, 1783–1861, Volume One, Campaigns and Generals, Boyd Publishing, 2000.

1805 births
1854 deaths
Democratic Party Georgia (U.S. state) state senators
Georgia (U.S. state) lawyers
Democratic Party members of the Georgia House of Representatives
University of Georgia alumni
Democratic Party members of the United States House of Representatives from Georgia (U.S. state)
American slave owners
19th-century American politicians
19th-century American lawyers